Diospyros geminata is a small tree or shrub of dry rainforest, gallery forest and sub tropical rainforest of Australia and New Guinea.

References

geminata
Flora of Queensland
Bushfood